The Fagne or la Fagne is a natural region in southern Belgium and northern France, sometimes grouped with Famenne as Fagne-Famenne. It should not be confused with the High Fens, which are further east and straddle the border of Belgium and Germany.

Etymology
The word Fagne comes from the Walloon language, and means 'swampy ground'. This term comes from the Old Low Franconian *fanja 'mud', in turn coming from the Gothic fani 'mud'. The English term 'fen' is a cognate. The Haute Fagnes in eastern Belgium share the same etymology.

Geography

The Fagne is mostly in the provinces of Namur and Hainaut in Wallonia in southern Belgium. It extends west into the French Arrondissement of Avesnes-sur-Helpe in the Nord department, in the Nord-Pas de Calais region. It is bounded on the east by the river Meuse, east of which lies Famenne, similar to the Fagne both geographically and naturally. To the north of both lies the Condroz natural region. The Fagne and Famennes are at the western edge of the Ardennes mountain range.

Philippeville is the largest and most important town in The Fagne, and considered an unofficial capital of sorts. Other settlements of note include Couvin, Cerfontaine, Rance, Trélon and Solre-le-Château.

References

Natural regions of Belgium
Areas of Belgium
Forestry in Belgium
Wetlands of Belgium
Geographical, historical and cultural regions of France
Forestry in France
Wetlands of Metropolitan France
Regions of Wallonia
Landforms of Wallonia
Landforms of Hainaut (province)
Landforms of Namur (province)
Landforms of Ardennes (department)
Landforms of Nord (French department)
Philippeville